The Forresters Manuscript is a quarto book of 21 English Robin Hood ballads (including two versions of one ballad, The Jolly Pinder of Wakefield), believed to have been written sometime in the 1670s. It's named the Forresters Manuscript after the first and last ballads in the book, which are both titled in the book, Robin Hood and the Forresters.This manuscript remained undiscovered and unknown for over 300 years after it was written until it turned up at an auction house in 1993, where it was found by the Bristol bookseller A. R. Heath, sold to the London book-dealer Bernard Quaritch Ltd., and then came to rest in the British Library. It was then published for the first time in 1998 as Robin Hood: The Forresters Manuscript, edited by Stephen Knight.

While all 21 ballads had already been published in broadside ballads and garlands in the 17th and 18th centuries, 13 of the ballads in Forresters are noticeably different from how they appear in the broadsides and garlands, 9 of these ballads being substantially longer. 4 of the ballads in Forresters would be the earliest known versions of these ballads. The Forresters Manuscript has been praised by scholars for improving the ballads from how they appeared in the broadsides and garlands. When Stephen Knight and Thomas H. Ohlgren published Robin Hood and Other Outlaw Tales in 1997, they included the Forresters versions of The Noble Fisherman and Robin Hood and Queen Katherine, citing the Forresters versions as the best versions of these ballads.

The manuscript 

The original quarto is in the British Library, known as Additional MS 71158. The book is made of binding of smooth dark brown calf, containing 102 unpaginated leaves of paper. Most of the paper is watermarked similar to an example dated to London in 1677, with the first and last few pages containing the watermark "I C O", denoting the papermaker I. Coulard, who was active circa 1671-1686. These watermarks, and the fact that the last 4 ballads appear to be directly copied from the 1670 Robin Hood Garland, have led scholars to conclude the manuscript was written in the 1670s.

The handwriting in the manuscript appears to be by two people. Hand A wrote all of the first 4 ballads, and the opening stanzas of the rest, including all of ballads 9, 10B, and 16. Hand B wrote the bulk of ballads 5-8, 10A, 11-15, and 17-21. Knight speculated that, "the supervisor was a person of leisure, who found the mechanics of copying taxing, and from ballad 5 on usually employed a professional to complete each text."

Contents 

Of the 21 ballads in the Manuscript, 17 had previously been published individually as broadsides. 16 of those ballads (the exception is Robin Hood and the Tinker) were later published together in the 1663 Robin Hood Garland. All 16 of these ballads were then later reprinted in the 1670 Robin Hood Garland. Of these 16 ballads, 6 of them have noticeably longer versions in Forresters. The 4 remaining ballads in Forresters had never been published before, and the Forresters versions of these ballads are the earliest known versions. One of these, Robin Hood and Allan-a-Dale, would be published as a broadside in the 1670s around the same time the Forresters Manuscript was being written, and the broadside version is actually longer. The remaining 3 previously unpublished ballads would not be published until the 18th century. All 3 of the 18th century versions are noticeably shorter than the versions in Forresters.

Possible purpose of the manuscript  

Steven Knight speculated that the original editor of the manuscript was planning to publish their own garland, one that would outdo the 1663 garland. All the ballads in the 1663 Garland were based on the ballads as they appeared in the earlier broadsheets (except for a shorter, alternate version of Robin Hood and Queen Katherine, which was published in the garland along with the broadside version of the same ballad). The original editor of Forresters appears to have been relying on older, longer manuscripts, now lost, without having to shorten them to fit on a broadsheet. Knight further speculated that the editor was initially unaware of the 1670 garland, and when they found out about it, it upset their plans for publishing their own garland. That might explain why the last 4 ballads in the Manuscript seem to be directly copied from the 1670 garland.

Differences between Forresters and the broadsides 

The following chart is a list of the ballads in the Forresters Manuscript in the order in which they appear in the manuscript. Most of the ballads in Forresters have different titles from the broadside ballads, generally less dramatic and attention-getting. For different versions to be described as "nearly identical", both versions have the same number of stanzas, where each line conveys the same meaning, even if the words are different.

An * before a Broadside Title indicates that there is also another version of the ballad in the Percy Folio. Since none of the Percy Folio versions are complete, the number of stanzas in these versions are not counted.

References 

1670s books
17th-century manuscripts
Robin Hood books